Edoardo Mariani (5 March 1893 – 7 January 1956) was an Italian footballer who played as a left winger.

International career
Mariani made four appearances for Italy, all of which came in 1912. He became the youngest forward to start a match for Italy, when he made his debut against France, starting in a 3–4 friendly loss in Turin on 17 March 1912, at the age of 19 years and 12 days. Mariani is either the third or fourth-youngest player ever to start a match for Italy, behind only Conti, Eugenio Mosso, and possibly Rodolfo Gavinelli. He later competed for Italy in the men's football tournament at the 1912 Summer Olympics. Mariani made 3 appearances for Italy at the 1912 Summer Olympics, including his final international appearance, which came in a 5–1 defeat to Austria on 3 July.

References

External links
Profile at Maglia Rossonera 
Profile at Italia 1910 
Profile at FIGC 

1893 births
1956 deaths
Italian footballers
Italy international footballers
Olympic footballers of Italy
Footballers at the 1912 Summer Olympics
Footballers from Milan
Association football forwards
A.C. Milan players
Genoa C.F.C. players
S.S. Lazio players
Savona F.B.C. players